Svetitsa is a rural locality (a village) in Pogorelovskoye Rural Settlement, Totemsky District, Vologda Oblast, Russia. The population was 4 as of 2002. There are 5 streets.

Geography 
Svetitsa is located 57 km southwest of Totma (the district's administrative centre) by road. Toporikha is the nearest rural locality.

References 

Rural localities in Totemsky District